Henry Schacht (born October 16, 1934) is an American businessman, a former chairman and chief executive officer of Cummins Diesel (1973–1994), and later CEO of Lucent Technologies.

Previously he was on the boards of CBS, Chase Manhattan, and Alcoa.

He assumed the Lucent CEO role in a transitory capacity upon Lucent's spinoff from AT&T Corporation, and served from 1995 to 1997. Mr. Schacht was brought back in 2001 to replace Richard McGinn, who had served as Lucent's CEO during the intervening years. 
He is currently the managing director and senior advisor of the  private equity firm Warburg Pincus LLC New York.

Schacht was a member of both the American Philosophical Society and the American Academy of Arts and Sciences.

Sources

References

Harvard Business School alumni
Living people
1930s births
American chairpersons of corporations
Members of the American Philosophical Society